Kaya, also known as Kaya, I'll Kill You is a 1967 Yugoslav feature film directed by Vatroslav Mimica.

In 1999, a poll of Croatian film critics found it to be one of the best Croatian films ever made.

References

External links

1967 films
Croatian crime drama films
Yugoslav crime drama films
Serbo-Croatian-language films
Films directed by Vatroslav Mimica
Jadran Film films
Croatian war drama films
Yugoslav war drama films